The Northern Territory frog (Austrochaperina adelphe), also known as the peeping land frog, Top End chirper and Top End tiny frog, is a species of frog in the family Microhylidae.
It is endemic to Australia.
Its natural habitats are subtropical or tropical swamps, moist savanna, intermittent rivers, swamps, intermittent freshwater marshes, plantations, rural gardens, heavily degraded former forest, and canals and ditches.

References

Austrochaperina
Amphibians of the Northern Territory
Taxonomy articles created by Polbot
Amphibians described in 1985
Frogs of Australia